Nodulosis–arthropathy–osteolysis syndrome is a cutaneous condition that shares features with juvenile hyaline fibromatosis.

See also 
 Winchester syndrome
 List of cutaneous conditions

References 

Connective tissue diseases